Lois Lane is a fictional reporter, a comic book character in DC Comics.

Lois Lane may also refer to:

Television
Lois Lane (Smallville), character in the 2000s Superman TV series Smallville

Literature
Lois Lane, Girl Reporter, a 1940s newspaper comic strip
Superman's Girl Friend, Lois Lane, first published 1958, a comic book series from DC Comics
Lois Lane, first published 2015,  a young adult novel series by Gwenda Bond

Theater
Lois Lane, character in the Broadway musical Kiss Me, Kate

Artist
Lois Lane (artist), an American painter born in 1948
Lois K. Alexander Lane, (1916 - 2007) American fashion designer, and museum curator

Music
 Lois Lane, born 1944, half of the 1960s British singing duo The Caravelles
 Loïs Lane (band), founded 1984, a Dutch girl duo Suzanne and Monique Klemann

Songs
"Lois Lane", a song by Farrah from the 2001 album Moustache
"Lois Lane", a song by Sloppy Seconds from the 2008 album Endless Bummer
"Lois Lane", a song by Franz Ferdinand from the 2018 album Always Ascending

See also
Lois & Clark: The New Adventures of Superman, a 1990s Superman television series
Superman: Lois and Clark, a comic book limited series published in 2015 from DC Comics
Origin of the name Lois
Superman and Lois Lane
Lois Lane in other media